Wright Laboratory was a research and development organization operated by the United States Air Force Materiel Command on Wright-Patterson AFB starting in 1990. The Laboratory was eventually merged into the Air Force Research Laboratory in 1997.

The Laboratory was named after the Wright brothers, American pioneers of aviation and the namesake of Wright-Patterson AFB.

References

Research installations of the United States Air Force